The Norwegian Wholesale Paper Merchants Association (PGL) is an employers' organisation in Norway.

It is a member of the Federation of Norwegian Commercial and Service Enterprises as well as EUGROPA, the European Paper Merchants Association. Chairman of the board is Per Claudi.

External links
Official site

Employers' organisations in Norway
Organisations based in Oslo